Pronto Pup is an amusement park and carnival food similar to a corn dog made with flour mix, which is used by restaurants and street vendors across the United States.  Named for the speed of the cooking process, the Pronto Pup was invented in Rockaway Beach, Oregon and is marketed as the original corn dog.

Pronto Pup batter is made with pancake batter, whereas non-descript corn dogs use variations of cornbread batter. While both include cornmeal, the difference is in the sweetness: corn dogs have it; Pronto Pups don’t. 

Today, the Pronto Pup brand reflects both the specific type of batter used for the first corn dogs and the shared brand name of restaurants who use the batter manufactured by The Pronto Pup Company based in Portland, Oregon. Outside of Oregon, where they were invented, Pronto Pups are a common food found in county fairs throughout Minnesota, Nebraska, Iowa, and North and South Dakota. Some differ from the original by using a bratwurst instead of a hot dog as the sausage.

Inventing the Pronto Pup 
The Pronto Pup was invented in Rockaway Beach, Oregon by husband-and-wife team George and Versa Boyington in the late 1930s. The Boyingtons ran a small hot dog stand on the beach, selling them to tourists and locals. 

While vending concessions in Rockaway Beach, Oregon, George Boyington hit a breaking point over Labor Day weekend in 1939 when the rain came and ruined his stock of hot dog buns. While feeding the scraps of his ruined buns to the seagulls, he began thinking of ways he could cook buns on the spot, as they were needed. 

From there, George Boyington developed the Pronto Pup, a deep-fried solution that was portable for vendors and pleasing to taste. He named it the “Pronto Pup” for the speed of the cooking process. The Pronto Pup made its big commercial debut from a fountain shop window owned by the Boyingtons in Portland, Oregon.  Right from the start, the tasty treat was a crowd favorite: in September 1941, over 15,000 Pronto Pups were consumed at the Pacific International Livestock Exposition.

While a few other places across the country claim to be the birthplace of the corn dog, no known claims predate the Boyingtons’ Rockaway Beach Pronto Pup invention.

Expansion 

The Boyingtons trademarked the Pronto Pup name in 1942, and began selling franchises of the carnival treat. Their company, later called The Pronto Pup Company headquartered in Portland, Oregon, would ship the franchisees the proprietary flour mix, but the rest was up to the business owners. There was only one rule: Pronto Pups could only be served plain or with mustard, but no ketchup. However, this rule was relaxed several decades later.

Following World War II, servicemen who had sampled and helped build the immense popularity of Pronto Pups while stationed throughout the Western states, realized the possibilities in Pronto Pup shops for their own post-war business. Franchises sprung up from coast to coast and Pronto Pups become a national sensation. 

Very few of these original Pronto Pup franchise restaurants exist today, but Pronto Pups can still be found at many carnivals and county fairs courtesy of franchise street vendors.

Pronto Pup Franchises 

Those who wish to visit the “home of the corn dog” can visit the Original Pronto Pup location in Rockaway Beach, OR. Founded in 1941 and as one of the few brick-and-mortar Pronto Pup franchises, they celebrate their history by also being home to the World's Largest Corn Dog and the World's Only Mechanical Riding Corn Dog at The Original Pronto Pup location off Highway 101.

One of the largest in the Mid-West is the franchised Pronto Pup booth at the annual Minnesota State Fair owned by the Karnis family. "Pronto Pups make up roughly 55% of hot dogs sold each year at the fair."

References

Brand name hot dogs
Food and drink companies established in 1941
1941 establishments in Oregon
Companies based in Portland, Oregon
Food and drink companies established in 1962
Privately held companies based in Oregon
1962 establishments in Oregon